Rastodentidae is a taxonomic family of minute sea snails, marine gastropod molluscs in the clade Littorinimorpha.

According to the taxonomy of the Gastropoda by Bouchet & Rocroi (2005) the family Rastodentidae has no subfamilies.

Genera
Genera within the family Rastodentidae include:
 Rastodens Ponder, 1966
 Tridentifera Ponder, 1966

References

Further reading 
 Taxonomicon (not up-to-date) 
 Powell A. W. B., New Zealand Mollusca, William Collins Publishers Ltd, Auckland, New Zealand 1979 

 
Taxa named by Winston Ponder